Simões Filho is a municipality in the state of Bahia in the North-East region of Brazil.

Notable people 
 Danilo Barbosa (born 28 February 1996), simply known as Danilo, is a Brazilian professional footballer who plays for Spanish club Valencia CF on loan from Braga as a defensive midfielder.

See also
List of municipalities in Bahia

References

Municipalities in Bahia